The Greenpoint (originally 10 Huron and also known as 21 India Street) is a two-building residential complex under development in the Greenpoint neighborhood of Brooklyn. The two buildings are a  tower with condos and a block-long five story building with rentals. It will be located next to a ferry stop.

History
Plans for the building were first released in October 2016. The building reached half its full height in November 2016, and topped out in February 2017.

Usage
The lower 27 floors of the tower will contain 287 rental units. The remaining floors will be dedicated to condo units. The building will include amenities including a parking garage and a courtyard.

Design
The building is split into a tower with 40 floors and a block-long, five story rental building devoted exclusively to rentals. The tower is massed in a way that is similar to traditional New York skyscrapers, split into base, shaft, and crown.

Gallery

See also
 List of tallest buildings in Brooklyn
 List of tallest buildings in New York City

References

Residential buildings in Brooklyn
Residential skyscrapers in New York City
Apartment buildings in New York City